Isaac Mulindwa Jr. is a businessman and entrepreneur in Uganda. In 2007, the New Vision newspaper reported him to be one of the wealthiest individuals in Uganda.

Background and education
He was born circa 1965 to Isaac Mulindwa, a businessman, and Safina Nakku Mulindwa, a housewife, in Mbarara, the second-born in a family of ten siblings. He attended Matale Primary School in Uganda, then the Grange in Nairobi. In 1982, he went to England where he did his A-Level at Kensington School. He attended Richmond University in the United States, graduating with a degree in finance and accounting. Later, he obtained a certificate in general construction and civil engineering from Miami Dade Community College.

Businesses and investments
His businesses include but are not limited to the following:

 Shareholding in Radio Simba FM
 Shareholding in Hot 100 FM
 Shareholding in Club Silk, a nightclub in Bugoloobi
 Shareholding in Liquid Silk, a restaurant in (Bugoloobi)
 Shareholding in Selas Ltd, a Marketing Firm  
 Mulin Group of companies (Ufit Micro Finance, Moma International, Mulindwa Plantations and Mullens Services)
 Mullens Services Inc., a construction company based in Miami, Florida, USA.
 One2net, an Internet services provider in Uganda.

See also
 List of wealthiest people in Uganda

References

External links
 About Mullens Services Inc.
 Meet Kampala's seen eligible bachelors

1965 births
Living people
Ganda people
Ugandan Muslims
Ugandan businesspeople
People from Mbarara
People from Western Region, Uganda